Albert Friedrich Veiel (8 June 1806 – 2 August 1874) was a German dermatologist who was a native of Ludwigsburg.

He studied at the Universities of Tübingen and Paris, and in 1829 earned his medical doctorate. In 1837 at Cannstatt, he founded the first in-patient dermatological clinic in Germany. The clinic was called the Heilanstalt für Flechtenkranke, and with orthopedist Jakob Heine (1800–1879) and others, Veiel was a catalyst in making Cannstatt an important center for medical treatment. The clinic attracted numerous celebrities and members of European aristocracy.

Selected publications 
 Grundzüge der Behandlung der Flechten in der Heilanstalt in Cannstatt, (Fundamentals of treatment at the Flechtenkranke Sanitarium in Cannstatt), (1843); Stuttgart. 
 Die Mineralquellen in Cannstatt, (Mineral springs in Cannstatt), (1852); Stuttgart. 
 Mittheilungen über die Behandlung der chronischen Hautkrankheiten in der Heilanstalt für Flechtenkranke in Cannstatt, (On the treatment of chronic skin diseases in the Sanitarium for Flechtenkranke at Cannstatt), (1862); Stuttgart.
 Der Kurort Cannstatt und seine Mineralquellen (The Cannstatt spa and its mineral springs), (1867).

References 

 This article incorporates translated text of an equivalent article at the German Wikipedia.

1806 births
1874 deaths
People from Ludwigsburg
University of Tübingen alumni
German dermatologists